Giovanni Gottardi (Faenza, 27 December 1733 - Rome, 1812) was an Italian painter, mainly of religious subjects.

He was active mainly in Rome, where he was a member of the Congregazione dei Virtuosi of the Pantheon. Some of his paintings were completed by his colleague Christopher Unterberger.  He painted Escape from Prison by St Peter for the church of Sant'Antonio Abate, Parma. He painted a Saints Augustine an Monica, and the Madonna of the Belt (1765) for the church of Sant'Agostino, Rome.

References

1733 births
1812 deaths
18th-century Italian painters
Italian male painters
19th-century Italian painters
19th-century Italian male artists
People from Faenza
18th-century Italian male artists